Hongqi District is a district of the city of Xinxiang, Henan province, China.

Administrative divisions
As 2012, this district is divided to 5 subdistricts, 2 towns and 1 township.
Subdistricts

Towns
Hongmen
Xiaodian

Townships
Guandi Township

References

County-level divisions of Henan
Xinxiang